= Cyril Turner (footballer) =

English footballer

Personal information
- Full name: Cyril Turner
- Place of birth: Berkshire, England
- Position: Full back

Senior career*
Years	Team	Apps	(Gls)
1919–1922	West Ham United	7	(1)
Total		7	(1)
- * Club domestic league appearances and goals

Cyril Turner was an English footballer who played in the Football League for West Ham United.
